Two mountains are named Mount Starr King in honor of Thomas Starr King (1824—1864):
 Mount Starr King (New Hampshire)
 Mount Starr King (California)